Trichordestra liquida is a species of cutworm or dart moth in the family Noctuidae. It is found in North America.

The MONA or Hodges number for Trichordestra liquida is 10308.

References

Further reading

 
 
 
 
 
 
 
 
 
 

Hadenini